Mushrif Park (in Arabic: حديقة مشرف) is 5.25 square kilometre (1300 acre) family-oriented park in Dubai, United Arab Emirates. It is located in the eastern part of the city (near the suburb of Khawaneej), about 16 km (10 mi) from the traditional center of Dubai. The park was created in early 1980s by Dubai Municipality and was widely expanded and refurbished in 1989.

Besides presenting 13 models of houses from around the world. The park presents other facilities including bicycle track, electronic entertaining games, football fields, theater screenings, excursion and barbeque services.

The entry fee to Mushrif Park is 10 dirhams per car. To use the swimming pool, adults pay 10 dirhams and children pay 5 dirhams.  The park is open daily from 0800 to 2300 (8:00 AM to 11:00 PM).

The park is located near Dubai International Airport which has promoted the hobby of Aircraft spotting in the region.

See also

List of parks in Dubai

References

External links 
Dubai Municipality: Dubai Public Parks: Mushrif Park

Parks in Dubai